The building of the Supreme Council of Crimea is an administrative building in Simferopol, Crimea. It housed the Supreme Council of the Autonomous Republic of Crimea and currently hosts the State Council of Republic of Crimea following the annexation of Crimea by the Russian Federation in 2014.

History
The building was built in place of a former cinema theatre for children "Alyie Parusa" (Crimson Sails) that before 1965 carried the name "Pioneer". Before the October Revolution in 1917 here was quartered a city police complex with jail.

Before 1980 the theatrical building was liquidated and in September 1980 a construction of the new building of the Crimea regional committee of Communist Party broke ground. According to the head of construction department of the Crimea regional committee of Communist Party Yevhen Krotenko (Merited Builder of Ukraine) it was planned to place in the building the city and regional committees of the Komsomol of Ukraine (LKSMU).

The cinema theater and several residential houses were demolished. The city executive committee headed by Mykhailo Lozovyi resettled away residents from the torn down apartments. The draft of the new regional administrative building was ordered by architects of one of the Moscow institutes T.Kurdiani, G.Isaakovich, and engineers D.Valov, S.Popkov. Construction of the building essentially a dominant of the city center was carried out by the 7th construction administration of the trust "Simferopolpromstroi" headed by Oleksandr Shvechikov.

For nearly eight years a construction fence was enclosing the area in the center of the capital. During that period the most noticed were construction brigades of Viktor Horoshchak and Maria Sheludko. Some of building materials were brought from the Mytishchi Special Factory. According to Yevhen Krotenko, during that time leaders of "Glavmoststroimaterily" Mark Zokhin and Aleksei Dementiev were very helpful.

After the fall of the Soviet Union the building was granted to the Supreme Council of Crimea.

In a military operation leading up to the annexation of Crimea by the Russian Federation, masked gunmen seized the building and raised a Russian flag.

References

External links
 Ulitsa Karla Marksa. Simferopol yesterday and today.
 Cinema theater "Alyie Parusa". Simferopol yesterday and today.
 Shirokov, V., Shirokov, O. History of ulitsa Karla Marksa in Simferopol. "Simferopol. Streets tell".
 Pupkova, N. History of building construction of the Verkhovna Rada of Crimea in Simferopol. "Krymskaya Pravda". October 22, 2010.

Buildings and structures in Simferopol
Legislative buildings in Europe
Government buildings in Ukraine